The 2019 Tour de France was the 106th edition of the Tour de France, one of cycling's three Grand Tours. The -long race consisted of 21 stages, starting in the Belgian capital of Brussels on 6 July, before moving throughout France and concluding on the Champs-Élysées in Paris on 28 July. A total of 176 riders from 22 teams participated in the race. His teammate and 2018 Tour winner Geraint Thomas finished second while Steven Kruijswijk came in third.

Kruijswijk's teammate Mike Teunissen won stage 1's bunch sprint to take the first yellow jersey of the Tour. Julian Alaphilippe of  took the lead of the race following his victory of stage 3. He lost the yellow jersey after the sixth stage to Giulio Ciccone who was the highest placed rider of a breakaway group that finished ahead of the peloton (main group). Ciccone's lead of the Tour lasted two stages, before Alaphilippe retook it after stage 8. Against expectations, he held the yellow jersey for the next eleven stages, including the Pyrenees, before losing it to Bernal on the second day in the Alps, stage 19, which was shortened by inclement weather. Bernal held his lead in the final two stages to win the Tour.

The points classification was won by 's Peter Sagan for a record seventh time, with Romain Bardet of  winning the mountains classification. Bernal also won the young rider classification. Caleb Ewan of  won the most stages, with three.

Teams

The 2019 edition of the Tour de France consisted of 22 teams. The race was the 27th of the 38 events in the UCI World Tour, and all of its 18 UCI WorldTeams were entitled, and obliged, to enter the race. Additionally, Amaury Sport Organisation (ASO), the organisers of the Tour, invited four second-tier UCI Professional Continental teams to participate in the event. The three French and one Belgian teams had each participated in the race before. The presentation of the teams – where the members of each team's roster are introduced in front of the media and local dignitaries – took place in front of a crowd of 75,000 on the Grand-Place square in Brussels, Belgium, on 4 July, two days before the opening stage.

Each squad was allowed a maximum of eight riders, resulting in a start list total of 176. Of these, 33 competed in their first Tour de France. The riders came from 30 countries. Six countries had more than ten riders in the race: France (43), Belgium (21), Italy (15), Spain (13), Germany (11) and the Netherlands (11). The average age of riders in the race was 29.71 years, ranging from the 21-year-old Jasper Philipsen to the 39-year-old Lars Bak.  had the youngest average age while  had the oldest.

The teams participating in the race were:

UCI WorldTeams

 
 
 
 
 
 
 
 
 
 
 
 
 
 
 
 
 
 

UCI Professional Continental teams

Pre-race favourites

Pre-race predictions in the media, as well as the bookmakers, on the general classification were drastically altered when four-time Tour winner Chris Froome was ruled out with multiple injuries following his crash at the Critérium du Dauphiné three weeks before the Tour. Although he was third overall behind teammate and winner Geraint Thomas in the previous year's Tour, Froome was considered the 2019 Tour favourite before his crash. Another major absentee was the 2018 Tour runner-up Tom Dumoulin, who missed the Tour with a knee injury he picked up at the Giro d'Italia, the Grand Tour of Italy that took place a month before the Tour de France, and a race he won in 2017. With their absence, the Tour was expected to be a more open race, with Thomas and Bernal as the leading contenders. Their closest rivals were thought to be Romain Bardet, Jakob Fuglsang, Steven Kruijswijk, Mikel Landa, Vincenzo Nibali, Thibaut Pinot, Nairo Quintana and Adam Yates.

After celebrating his 2018 Tour victory, Thomas was overweight at the start of the 2019 season. His only result of note before the Tour was a third-place overall finish at the Tour de Romandie in early May. In June he abandoned the Tour de Suisse following a crash, and required recovery time, which put his ability to perform at the Tour in doubt. Bernal made his Tour debut in 2018 riding as a domestique (leader's assistant) for Froome and Thomas, who are ten years his senior. In the 2019 season, he was planned to lead his team's Giro squad, but missed the race after he broke his collarbone. His major wins of the season up to the Tour were the Paris–Nice stage race before his injury and the Tour de Suisse on his return. In the Tour, he was to share the leadership with Thomas according to the team, although some in the media expected an internal battle between the two.

Bardet had finished on the podium twice in his career, second in 2016 and third in 2017. His form was lacking in the build up to the Tour, although his experience and the consistency of his previous performances in the race were considered enough to make him a serious contender. Fuglsang was the most in-form contender, enjoying a successful spring classics campaign, including victory in the prestigious "monument" one-day race Liège–Bastogne–Liège as well as the stage races Vuelta a Andalucía and the Dauphiné. Fuglsang was thought likely to benefit from a strong team, but doubt was cast on his ability to perform over a three-week Grand Tour, as he had never finished in the top three places in a Grand Tour. That too was the case with Kruijswijk, who had performed well in the season and was considered a top contender, despite suffering with illness leading up to the Tour. Landa's form was considered harder to predict, as he had stayed away from racing after the Giro, where he just missed out on a podium place. His best overall result in the Tour so far had been in 2017, when he finished fourth riding as a domestique to Froome.

Veteran rider Nibali had no wins so far in 2019, but placed second overall at the Giro and was considered to be a danger due to his experience. He was the only rider on the start list apart from Thomas to have won a Tour, the 2014 edition. Pinot was also considered to be in form after finishing fifth overall in the Dauphiné, and before that, winning the general classification of the non-World Tour Tour de l'Ain and Tour du Haut Var. It was however speculated that the pressure of being a home favourite could affect him negatively, as well having issues with heat. His previous results in the Tour had been mixed: he had finished third in 2014, but had dropped out of the race twice since then. Quintana, a two-time Grand Tour winner, was seen as a podium contender. Yates returned to the race after finishing 29th overall the previous year. Although he withdrew from the Dauphiné a few weeks earlier for illness, he had been in good form before then.

Other riders expected to place high in the general classification were Emanuel Buchmann, Dan Martin, Enric Mas, Richie Porte, Rigoberto Urán and Tejay van Garderen (both ), Alejandro Valverde and Ilnur Zakarin.

The 2018 winner of the points classification, Peter Sagan, returned to defend his title in an attempt to break Erik Zabel's record of six wins. Before the Tour he shared the record with Zabel, after winning the classification in six out of the past seven editions. Sagan was regarded as the clear favourite for winning the points classification. The riders thought to be Sagan's biggest rivals were Caleb Ewan, Dylan Groenewegen, Michael Matthews and Elia Viviani. Other contenders for the green jersey were Julian Alaphilippe, Edvald Boasson Hagen, Alexander Kristoff and Wout van Aert.

Route and stages

On 30 May 2017, the ASO announced that Brussels would host the 2019 edition's opening stages (known as the Grand Départ), honouring one of the Tour's most successful riders, Belgian Eddy Merckx, on the 50th anniversary of his first of five overall victories. It was the second time the Grand Départ had taken place in Brussels and was the fifth Belgian Grand Départ. It also marked 100 years since the race leader's yellow jersey was first seen at a Tour. Further details of the Grand Départ were revealed on 16 January 2018: the opening stage that featured the Muur van Geraardsbergen climb, an iconic steep cobbled climb of the Tour of Flanders "monument" race, and a second stage team time trial around the streets of Brussels. The entire route, which the race director Christian Prudhomme described as "the highest Tour in history", was unveiled on 25 October 2018.

The opening stage visited Charleroi and looped back to Brussels, to connect the regions of Flanders and Wallonia in a stage. Starting in Binche, the third stage left Belgium for France, with the following stage taking the race to the north-east to the Vosges Mountains for two further stages. The transitional stage 7 moved the Tour south-west and towards the Massif Central highland region, with stage 8 ending in the city of Saint-Étienne. Stages 9 and 10 traversed the Massif Central, before the Tour's first rest day. The following two stages moved the race to the Pyrenees, which hosted four stages. After the second rest day, the Tour took a long transfer east for stage 16, finishing in Nîmes. Stage 17 took the race up to the Alps at Gap. After three Alpine stages, an air transfer moved the Tour to the outskirts of Paris, ending with the Champs-Élysées stage.

There were two time trial events, stage 2's  team time trial and stage 13's  individual time trial. Of the remaining nineteen stages, seven were officially classified as flat, five as hilly and seven as mountainous. The route contained five mountain-top finishes: stage 6, to La Planche des Belles Filles; stages 14, to the Col du Tourmalet; stage 15, to Foix; stage 19, to Col de l'Iseran; and stage 20, to Val Thorens. The Iseran mountain pass, the highest paved pass in Europe, featured on stage 19. This was the seventh time that the Tour climbed the  Iseran, but only the second ascent from the more difficult southern side. It was among five hors catégorie (beyond category) rated climbs in the race. Of the 34 stage start or finish hosts, the race visited Binche, Saint-Dié-des-Vosges and Pont du Gard for the first time.

Race overview

First week: Belgium, north-eastern to southern France

Stage 1's bunch sprint finish was won by 's Mike Teunissen. He was initially a member of the team's sprint train who were leading out their designated sprinter Dylan Groenewegen, but following Groenewegen's crash in the closing , Teunissen was free to race in the sprint. He took the first yellow and green jerseys as the leader of the general and points classifications respectively. Early in the stage, Greg Van Avermaet led the breakaway group over the highest categorised climb of the stage, the third-category Muur van Geraardsbergen, claiming the lead in the mountains classification and the first polka dot jersey as the leader of the classification.

Teunissen increased his overall lead in the race following his team's victory in stage 2's team time trial, finishing twenty seconds ahead of second-placed . Peter Sagan and Tim Wellens took the green and polka dot jerseys respectively. The following day's flat stage ended in a bunch sprint won by Elia Viviani.

The climbs of stage 5 did not cause trouble to the race, as most of the stage contenders retained their energy for the following stage's steep finish of the first-category Planche des Belles Filles climb. An early four-man breakaway, which included mountains classification leader Wellens, was caught well before the sprint bunch finish, won by Sagan. The mountainous stage 6 saw a 14-strong breakaway gain a lead of more than 8 minutes. By the second-category Col des Chevrères, only four riders remained. Wellens and Xandro Meurisse, the former having secured his polka dot jersey for another day, were distanced on the final climb by Dylan Teuns and Giulio Ciccone. Teuns went on to win the stage, and despite Ciccone fading before Teuns in the final metres of the climb he managed to take over the yellow jersey, as the strongest of the peloton (main group) came in over one and a half minutes behind, with former leader Alaphilippe standing six seconds down in second place. The final  also proved to be a difficulty for general classification contenders Vincenzo Nibali, Richie Porte and Romain Bardet, who lost time on the climb.

Stage 7, returning to the flat after the Vosges Mountains, was uneventful, with the breakaway being held by the peloton to only a few minutes, and despite early crashes by Tejay van Garderen and Teunissen, ended in a technical bunch sprint won by Groenewegen. As the successive climbs were passed, this number was gradually reduced, with only Thomas De Gendt and Alessandro De Marchi surviving until the final climb, on which De Gendt successfully distanced him. With the breakaway duo's advantage down to under a minute in the final kilometres, Alaphilippe and Thibault Pinot attacked and gained twenty seconds on the much reduced peloton, as De Gendt managed to hold on for the stage victory, with Alaphilippe regaining his yellow jersey. Defending champion Geraint Thomas survived his second crash in this edition of the Tour.

Stage 9 saw an early 15-strong breakaway form, which the peloton let go. Following this, a leading trio emerged, consisting of Nicolas Roche, Tiesj Benoot and Daryl Impey. Roche was dropped before the finish, leaving the victory to Impey who overcame Benoot in the final sprint, in a day which otherwise saw no significant changes in the overall standings.

The tenth stage was on relatively flat terrain. This effort proved decisive, as several overall contenders who were caught behind, including Pinot, Richie Porte, Rigoberto Urán, Jakob Fuglsang and Mikel Landa, lost time on the front group. Thomas, Egan Bernal, Alaphilippe and Bardet maintained their position at the front of the race, amongst a reduced bunch. The victory went to Wout van Aert, as several of the main sprinters were caught behind, including his  teammate Groenewegen.

By the first rest day, which was a day later than usual, the general classification was led by Alaphilippe, who had a lead of 1' 12" on Thomas, behind whom was Bernal in third place, just 4" from Thomas. Home favourite Pinot, despite being 1' 21" back from Thomas in eleventh place, was considered by his directeur sportif Marc Madiot to still be in contention. In the points classification, pre-race favourite Sagan was in first position, already 62 points ahead of second-placed Michael Matthews. The mountains classification was more closely contested, with breakaway riders and  teammates Wellens and De Gendt respectively first and second, with a gap of six points.

Second week: Southern France and Pyrenees

Stage 11's small breakaway was caught with  remaining, before Caleb Ewan won the bunch sprint finish. The first Pyrenean stage, the twelfth, saw a 42-rider breakaway reduce to a group of Simon Yates, Pello Bilbao and Gregor Mühlberger on the final climb of La Hourquette d'Ancizan, the second of the stage's two first-category climbs. The trio descended to the finish at Bagnères-de-Bigorre, where Yates won the sprint. The majority of the peloton came in close to ten minutes after. A notable abandonment of the stage, for personal reasons, was the reigning world time trial champion Rohan Dennis, a favourite for the following day's time trial.

In the aforementioned stage, Alaphilippe took the victory, with a time of 35' 00" across the  course, achieving a victory on a day where he was expected to lose time to riders such as Thomas, who ended up in second place, fourteen seconds down. Wout van Aert, one of the favourites for the stage, had to abandon the race during the time trial after he crashed, having clipped a barrier on the side of the road.

On stage 14, the last of the breakaway riders were caught by the leading group of general classification contenders at  before the finish atop the hors catégorie Col du Tourmalet. With  remaining, Thomas got detached from the lead group containing Alaphilippe, Emanuel Buchmann, Pinot, Bernal, Landa and Steven Kruijswijk. Pinot attacked in the final  and held his lead to the finish line at the summit.

On the final stage in the Pyrenees, Simon Yates took his second stage win of the race from a reduced breakaway of six at the summit of the  first-category climb to Prat d'Albis. Pinot attacked the group of general classification contenders with  remaining to finish in second place with Landa, 33 seconds behind, progressing to fourth overall. The duo of Bernal and Buchmann came in 33' down, followed by the last few breakaway riders, and then the group of favourites, led by Thomas, who finished 1' 22" behind Yates.

The following day was the Tour's second rest day. By this point, overall race leader Alaphilippe was exceeding expectations, with a 1' 35" lead over Thomas. Kruijswijk was third at 1' 47", followed by Pinot, Bernal and Buchmann respectively. The green jersey was still held by Sagan, who now had a lead of 85 points over second-placed Viviani, while the mountains classification was still led by Wellens.

Third week: Southern France, Alps and finale in Paris

As the Tour came down from the Pyrenees for transitional stages towards the Alps, it experienced the beginning of the July 2019 European heat wave, which saw temperatures reach a high of  during stage 16. Ewan won the stage from a bunch sprint in Nîmes, his second of the Tour. Crashes during the stage included overall favourites Thomas and Fuglsang, with the latter forced to abandon. In the following stage, the 33-rider breakaway's advantage grew to 15 minutes at one point. Luke Rowe and Tony Martin were both disqualified from the Tour following an altercation near the front of the peloton in the latter part of the stage.

Stage 18, the first in the Alps, was led by breakaway riders throughout the stage's climbs, which included the first-category Col de Vars and the hors catégorie Col d'Izoard and Col du Galibier. The 34-strong breakaway had been reduced to a group of elite riders by the foot of the Galibier, the final climb. Nairo Quintana attacked with  still to climb, and by the summit had built a lead of over a minute and a half, which he held on the descent to the finish. Meanwhile, with  remaining of the Galibier, Bernal attacked from within the group of general classification contenders containing Alaphilippe and Thomas, allowing Bernal to recover half a minute on his rivals by the finish and move up to second overall. The lead of the mountains classification went to Romain Bardet, who was a pre-race favourite for the yellow jersey but moved out of contention after losing 20 minutes on stage 14's Col du Tourmalet, thereafter switching focus to breakaway rides.

Around  into stage 19, Pinot, who had been placed fifth in the general classification, abandoned the race with a leg muscle injury. At the head of the race in the closing kilometres of the planned second to last climb, the hors catégorie Col de l'Iseran, Bernal attacked from the group of overall contenders, catching and passing final breakaway riders by the summit. Next over the top were breakers Simon Yates and Warren Barguil, one minute behind Bernal, with the yellow jersey contenders following. Alaphilippe was dropped following Bernal's attack, and was two minutes behind at the summit. During the descent, the race was neutralised when a hailstorm caused ice and landslides to block the route to the final climb to Tignes, particularly a mudslide at the foot of the descent before Val-d'Isère. Times for the general classification were taken at the summit of the Iseran, with the stage victory and most combative rider of the day not awarded. As a result, Bernal, who had been in second place overall, moved ahead of Alaphilippe and took the yellow jersey.

A group of 29 riders established a two-and-a-half minute lead over the peloton, before being vastly reduced to six on the early slopes of the Val Thorens climb. With  remaining, Nibali attacked from this group and soloed to victory, ten seconds ahead of chasers Landa and Alejandro Valverde. Close behind, Bernal and Thomas led the other general classification contenders Urán, Buchmann and Kruijswijk. Alaphilippe was dropped again, losing three minutes to Bernal and dropping from second overall to fifth.

The final stage in Paris was won by Ewan in a bunch sprint on the Champs-Élysées, his third win and the most of any rider in this edition of the race. Bernal won the race with no changes in the final stage.  The 22-year-old Colombian became the youngest since François Faber in 1909 and first Latin American Tour winner. Thomas came second overall, 1' 11" down on Bernal, with Kruijswijk a further 20 seconds behind in third. Sagan won a record seventh points classification with a total of 316, 68 ahead of Ewan in second. Bardet won the mountains classification with 86 points, 8 ahead of Bernal in second. The young rider classification was won by Bernal, with thirteenth-placed overall Gaudu second. Bernal became the fifth rider to win both the general and young rider classification in the same year, following Laurent Fignon (1983), Jan Ullrich (1997), Alberto Contador (2007), and Andy Schleck (2010). The  squad finished as the winners of the team classification, 47' 54" ahead of second-placed . Of the 176 starters, 155 reached the finish of the last stage in Paris.

Classification leadership and minor prizes
Four main individual classifications and a team competition were contested in the race. The most important was the general classification, calculated by adding each rider's finishing times on each stage. Time bonuses (time subtracted) were awarded at the end of every stage apart from the time trial stages. The first three riders received 10, 6, and 4 seconds, respectively. In an effort to animate racing in the general classification, time bonuses of 8, 5, and 2 seconds respectively were also awarded for the first three riders across a mountain summit, given out on eight climbs. These occurred on stages 3, 6, 8, 9, 12, 15, 18, and 19. These bonuses replaced the special time "bonus point" sprints that were a feature in the 2018 edition. For crashes within the final  of a stage, not including time trials and summit finishes, any rider involved would have received the same time as the group he was in when the crash occurred. The rider with the lowest cumulative time was the winner of the general classification and was considered to be the overall winner of the Tour. The rider leading the classification wore a yellow jersey. In celebration of 100th anniversary of the yellow jersey, individual jersey designs were worn on each stage, apart from the first.

Additionally, there was a points classification. Riders received points for finishing among the highest placed in a stage finish, or in intermediate sprints during the stage. The points available for each stage finish were determined by the stage's type, and sprints, with the first fifteen places in all receiving points. In flat stages, 50 points were given to the stage winner, down to 2 points for 15th place. In hilly stages, the winner gained 30 points, also down to 2 points. In mountain stages, individual time trials and intermediate sprints, 20 points were given to the winners, down to 1 point. The cyclist with the most points led the classification, and was identified with a green jersey.

There was also a mountains classification. Most stages of the race included one or more categorised climbs, in which points were awarded to the riders that reached the summit first. The climbs were categorised as fourth-, third-, second-, and first-category and hors catégorie, with the more difficult climbs rated lower. Mountains ranked hors catégorie gave 20 points to the first rider to cross the summit, down to 2 points to the 8th cyclist. For first-category climbs, 6 riders received points, with 10 for the first rider to reach the summit. Second-, third- and fourth-category climbs gave 5, 2 and 1 points to the first rider respectively. The cyclist with the most points led the classification, wearing a white jersey with red polka dots.

The final individual classification was the young rider classification. This was calculated the same way as the general classification, but only riders under 26 years were eligible. This meant that in order to compete in the classification, a rider had to be born after 1 January 1994. Of the 176 starters, 48 were eligible. The leader wore a white jersey.

The classification for the teams was calculated by adding together the times of the first three cyclists of a team on each stage; the leading team was the one with the lowest cumulative time. The number of stage victories and placings per team would have determined the outcome of a tie. The riders on the team that led this classification were identified with yellow number bibs on the back of their jerseys and yellow helmets.

In addition, there was a combativity award given after each stage to the rider considered, by a jury, to have "made the greatest effort and who demonstrated the best qualities of sportsmanship". No combativity awards were given for the time trials and the final stage. The winner wore a red number bib for the following stage. At the conclusion of the Tour, Julian Alaphilippe won the overall super-combativity award, again awarded by a jury.

A total of €2,291,700 was awarded in cash prizes in the race. The overall winner of the general classification received €500,000, with the second and third placed riders getting €200,000 and €100,000 respectively. All finishers in the top 160 were awarded money. The holders of the classifications benefited on each stage they led; the final winners of the points and mountains were given €25,000, while the best young rider and most combative rider got €20,000. The team classification winners earned €50,000. €11,000 was given to the winners of each stage of the race, with smaller amounts given to places 2–20. There were also two special awards each with a prize of €5000. The Souvenir Jacques Goddet, given to the first rider to pass Goddet's memorial at the summit of the Col du Tourmalet in stage 14, and the Souvenir Henri Desgrange, given to the first rider to pass the summit of the highest climb in the Tour, the Col de l'Iseran on stage 19. Thibaut Pinot won the Jacques Goddet and Egan Bernal claimed the Henri Desgrange.

 On stages 2 and 3, Peter Sagan, who was second in the points classification, wore the green jersey, because first placed Mike Teunissen wore the yellow jersey as leader of the general classification.
 On stages 7 and 8, Egan Bernal, who was second in the young rider classification, wore the white jersey, because first placed Giulio Ciccone wore the yellow jersey as leader of the general classification.
 On stages 20 and 21, David Gaudu, who was second in the young rider classification, wore the white jersey, because first placed Egan Bernal wore the yellow jersey as leader of the general classification.

Final standings

General classification

Points classification

Mountains classification

Young rider classification

Team classification

UCI rankings
For the UCI World Ranking system, riders from both the WorldTeams and Professional Continental teams competed individually, for their teams, and for their nations, winning points that contributed towards separate rankings, which included all UCI road races. There was also an individual ranking introduced for the 2019 season that only took into account UCI stage races, the Stage Race World Ranking. Points were awarded to the top 60 in the general classification, each yellow jersey given at the end of a stage, the top 5 finishers in each stage and for the top 3 in the final points and mountains classifications.

The points accrued by Egan Bernal moved him from 23rd to 6th in the individual World Ranking and from ninth to second in the Stage Race World Ranking.

See also

 2019 in sports
 2019 La Course by Le Tour de France – a women's one-day race held during the Tour

Notes

References

Bibliography

External links

 

 
2019 in Belgian sport
2019 in Brussels
2019 in French sport
2019 UCI World Tour
July 2019 sports events in France
2019